Aurel Zahan (8 August 1938 – 2010) was a Romanian water polo player. He competed at the 1956 Summer Olympics, the 1960 Summer Olympics and the 1964 Summer Olympics.

See also
 Romania men's Olympic water polo team records and statistics

References

External links
 

1938 births
2010 deaths
Romanian male water polo players
Olympic water polo players of Romania
Water polo players at the 1956 Summer Olympics
Water polo players at the 1960 Summer Olympics
Water polo players at the 1964 Summer Olympics
Water polo players from Bucharest